Nature Cancer is a monthly peer-reviewed academic journal published by Nature Portfolio. It was established in 2020. The editor-in-chief is Alexia-Ileana Zaromytidou.

Abstracting and indexing
The journal is abstracted and indexed in:

PubMed
MEDLINE
Science Citation Index Expanded
Scopus

According to the Journal Citation Reports, the journal has a 2021 impact factor of 23.177, ranking it 11th out of 245 journals in the category "Oncology".

References

External links

Nature Research academic journals
English-language journals
Oncology journals
Publications established in 2020
Monthly journals
Online-only journals